HMS Berwick was a 74-gun third rate ship of the line of the Royal Navy, launched on 11 September 1809 at Blackwall.

Career
At the action of 24 March 1811, Berwick under Captain James Macnamara led the pursuit and destruction of the French frigate Amazone near the Phare de Gatteville lighthouse, Normandy. One sailor was killed in the engagement.

The British drove off the French defenders, who left behind two 24-pounder guns and two mortars. The British lost two men killed and five wounded.

Fate

Berwick was broken up in 1821.

Notes

References

Lavery, Brian (2003) The Ship of the Line - Volume 1: The development of the battlefleet 1650-1850. Conway Maritime Press. .

Ships of the line of the Royal Navy
Vengeur-class ships of the line
1809 ships
Ships built by the Blackwall Yard